Stronger is the second album by reggae singer Fantan Mojah. It features the single "Stronger", as well as a collaborations with Ninja Ford & Zareb.

Track listing
Intro 
Stronger 
Jah Jah You Are The One feat. Ninja Ford
Dun Dem 
Can't Frame I (judgement time riddim, Bost & Bim / Special delivery music)
Stay Positive 
So Many Problems 
No Ordinary Herb 
Jah Time 
How Can I Be Ungrateful feat. Zareb
Most High Jah 
No Mercy feat. Zareb
Tell Lie Pon Rasta
Fight To Survive
Where Is Love
You Can Make It feat. Ninja Ford

References

2008 albums
Fantan Mojah albums